USS Ossipee may refer to the following ships of the United States Navy:

 , launched in 1861, commissioned in 1862 and decommissioned for the final time in 1889.
 , commissioned in 1915 for coastal service, transferred to the Navy in 1917, served in the Coast Guard during Prohibition, returned to the Navy in 1941 and decommissioned in 1945.

United States Navy ship names